Red Eye is a 2005 American psychological thriller film directed by Wes Craven and written by Carl Ellsworth based on a story by Ellsworth and Dan Foos. The film follows a hotel manager ensnared in an assassination plot by a terrorist while aboard a red-eye flight to Miami. The film score was composed and conducted by Marco Beltrami. It was distributed by DreamWorks Pictures and was released on August 19, 2005. The film received positive reviews from critics and fans of Craven's work and was a box office success. An extended version of the film, which added previously unused footage to increase the running time, was broadcast on the ABC network several times.

Plot
After attending her grandmother's funeral, hotel manager Lisa Reisert arrives at Dallas Love Field to take a red-eye flight back to Miami, Florida. She meets a handsome young man named Jackson Rippner, also traveling to Miami. While waiting to board, they share a drink at the airport bar and engage in small talk.

Lisa is surprised to find that Jackson is seated beside her. After takeoff, his charming demeanor quickly turns sinister as he informs her that he works for a domestic terrorist organization planning to assassinate Charles Keefe, the current United States Deputy Secretary of Homeland Security. Lisa's managerial position at the Lux Atlantic Hotel in Miami, where Keefe and his family are staying, is crucial to their plot.

As Acting Manager, Lisa must make a call from the in-flight phone to order the Keefe family be moved to a targeted room where a missile launched from a boat in the harbor will strike. Her non-compliance will result in Jackson's hitman accomplice killing Lisa's father, Joe.

While Jackson is distracted, Lisa writes a warning inside the self-help book she had previously given away to a friendly fellow-passenger. He head-butts her unconscious and retrieves the book before the woman reads the message. Lisa awakens half an hour later and is forced to make the call to the hotel.

When a storm disrupts the sky phone service mid-conversation with her co-worker, Cynthia, Lisa pretends to be ordering the room change until Jackson catches on. She then persuades him to let her use the restroom while the phone service is still disrupted. Lisa writes a fake bomb threat in soap on the mirror; Jackson, checking on her, sees it and angrily wipes it off. A young girl waiting outside becomes suspicious, telling the flight attendant that Jackson is inside with Lisa, but it is dismissed as a sexual escapade.

When the sky phones are operational again, Lisa calls Cynthia and has her move the Keefe family to the targeted suite. She then pleads with Jackson to call off the accomplice waiting outside Joe's house, but he refuses until the assassination is confirmed.

As the plane lands at Miami International Airport, Lisa reveals that she got the scar Jackson noticed on her chest during a violent rape at knife point two years earlier, and that she swore after the assault that something like that would never happen again. She then stabs Jackson in the throat with a ballpoint pen, grabs his phone, and flees the plane.

To further slow Jackson down, the young girl who had previously observed him and Lisa trips him, making it look like an accident. Lisa makes her way to the airport exit while evading both Jackson and security personnel; once outside, she steals an unattended SUV. She calls Cynthia, telling her to evacuate the hotel and warn all of the Keefes. Cynthia, the Keefes, and U.S. Secret Service agents escape seconds before a Javelin missile hits the room. 

The cell phone's battery dies as Lisa is calling her dad. Arriving at his house and seeing the hitman at the front door, she hits and kills him with the car when he shoots at her with a suppressed pistol. Lisa's dad is unharmed and has called 9-1-1.

Lisa calls Cynthia, unaware Jackson arrived and incapacitated her dad. He pursues her throughout the house. As they struggle, he throws her down the staircase. Lisa, stunned, retrieves the dead hitman's gun and shoots Jackson. Wounded, he disarms her and is about to kill her when a revived Joe shoots Jackson with the gun. Lisa returns to the hotel to provide assistance where Keefe praises both women for their actions.

Cast

 Rachel McAdams as Lisa Reisert
 Cillian Murphy as Jackson Rippner
 Brian Cox as Joe Reisert
 Jayma Mays as Cynthia
 Jack Scalia as Deputy Secretary of Homeland Security Charles Keefe
 Robert Pine as Bob Taylor
 Teresa Press-Marx as Marianne Taylor
 Angela Paton as Nice lady
 Suzie Plakson as Senior flight attendant
 Monica McSwain as Junior flight attendant
 Dane Farwell as Hitman at dad's house
 Laura Johnson as Blonde Woman
 Loren Lester as Doctor
 Max Kasch as Headphone kid
 Kyle Gallner as Headphone kid's Brother
 Brittany Oaks as Rebecca
 Beth Toussaint as Lydia Keefe
 Colby Donaldson as Keefe's head bodyguard
 Marc Macaulay as Coast Guard officer
 Jenny Wade as Coffee shop girl

Reception

Box office
Red Eye opened theatrically on August 19, 2005, in 3,079 venues, earning $16,167,662 in its opening weekend, ranking second in the domestic box office behind The 40-Year-Old Virgin ($21,422,815). At the end of its run, eight weeks later (on October 13), the film grossed $57,891,803 in the United States and Canada, and $37,685,971 overseas for a worldwide total of $95,577,774. Based on a $26 million budget, the film was a box office success.

Critical response
On Rotten Tomatoes the film holds an approval rating of 79% based on 193 critics, with an average rating of 6.68/10. The site's consensus states: "With solid performances and tight direction from Wes Craven, Red Eye is a brisk, economic thriller." On Metacritic, the film received a weighted score of 71 out of 100, based on 36 reviews, indicating "generally favorable reviews". Audiences polled by CinemaScore gave the film an average grade of "B" on an A+ to F scale.

Peter Travers of Rolling Stone gave the film a 3.5/4 stars calling it the "best thriller of summer 2005" and a "gripping suspense [that] will pin you to your seat".

Roger Ebert commended the film, calling it a "good thriller" that moves "competently [and] relentlessly". He praised Craven for making the film "function so smoothly" and "doing exactly what it was intended to do". Ebert also expressed admiration for the performances of McAdams and Murphy, stating that they are "very effective together". He said that McAdams is "so convincing because she keeps [her performance] at ground level" and "she remains plausible even when the action ratchets up around her". He also complimented Murphy for his "ability to modulate his character instead of gnashing the scenery". He gave the film 3/4 stars.

Manohla Dargis of The New York Times called the film a "nifty, tense thriller" and said that the casting of the two leads is "a nice surprise". She said that Murphy is "a picture-perfect villain" and McAdams has a "depth of intensity" that is uncommon.

USA Today film critic Claudia Puig said the film is "fun to watch because of the strong performances". She praised McAdams for blending "vulnerability and courage" to her performance and called Murphy "menacing". While she mentioned that the film is "tense, smart, and nerve-wracking" and "entertaining and scary" on the first hour, she criticizes the film for going "downhill" and becoming a "by-the-book action flick".

Varietys Robert Koehler stated that "Red Eye relies on hoodwinking an audience with its tension, so that the sheer illogic of the conspiracy plot can slip by without detection" but complimented McAdams for finding "new and interesting ways of silently projecting fear".

Wesley Morris of The Boston Globe felt the film was like a "poor cousin of an episode of 24. Call it 12."

In October 2006, the film ranked 25th in the 30 Even Scarier Movie Moments, a follow up to Bravo's The 100 Scariest Movie Moments which was aired in October 2004.

Awards and nominations

See also
 Flightplan, another 2005 psychological thriller taking place during a flight

References

External links

 
 
 
 
 

2000s mystery thriller films
2005 films
2005 action thriller films
2005 psychological thriller films
American aviation films
American action thriller films
American mystery thriller films
American psychological thriller films
DreamWorks Pictures films
2000s English-language films
Films about stalking
Films about terrorism
Films directed by Wes Craven
Films scored by Marco Beltrami
Films set in Miami
Films set on airplanes
Films shot in Los Angeles
Films shot in Miami
Films set in Fort Worth, Texas
2000s Russian-language films
2000s American films